Turpin is a small unincorporated community and census-designated place in Beaver County, Oklahoma, United States. The post office was established April 8, 1925. As of the 2010 census, the community had a population of 467.

History
Turpin was named for Carl Julian Turpin, a son of Thomas James Turpin and Elmanda (Kennerly) Turpin. Carl was born on 10 Aug 1871 in Quantico, Wicomico County, Maryland. He died 20 Nov 1942 in Oklahoma City.

Carl J. Turpin was the general manager of the Beaver, Meade and Englewood Railroad (BM&E). In 1918, two farmers from Hardtner, Kansas, Jacob Achenbach and Ira B. Blackstock, requested his assistance. Messrs. Achenbach and Blackstock had been asked by farmers in Beaver County and the surrounding areas to build a railroad through the Panhandle so that their wheat crops could be shipped to outlying markets. Achenbach and Blackstock knew how to build the railroad, but they needed someone to manage it. That is where Carl Julian Turpin came in. Turpin had ample experience as a railroad man, his career beginning in 1888.

Described as a "by the book" type of general manager, Turpin was a stern, well-groomed man. He worked without salary, but did receive stock in the line, from 1918 until 1926. At its height, the BM&E ran from Beaver, Oklahoma through Turpin and Eva, Oklahoma and continuing to a connection with the Santa Fe Railroad in Keyes, Oklahoma. The line connected with the Katy at Forgan and the Rock Island at Hooker. The BM&E was eventually sold to Missouri-Kansas-Texas Railroad (M-K-T or Katy) in 1931.
 
"When I was a kid 20 years old, but married, I used to want to work for a railroad which paid $50 a month and furnished its agents a two-story house on the line, rent, brooms, and matches free. Maybe I still could find something like that," Turpin said, after the sale of the BM&E.  The railway was eventually abandoned in 1972.

General
Turpin centers around its independent school district. It consists of a multi-building K-12 facility that draws its student body from surrounding farms and the housing communities of Ponderosa and Pheasant Run. This in turn means that, while Turpin is smaller than the surrounding communities of Beaver, Forgan, Hooker, and Tyrone, it has a comparatively large student body.

The school is the largest employer in the community, and the hub for community activities. Turpin comes to life between summers, beginning with football and basketball in the fall and ending with track, softball, and baseball in the spring. Turpin High School is recognized for its athletic success in class A winning championships in football, track, and golf. Notable alumni include former Dallas Cowboys defensive back Lynn Scott, award winning educator Sarah Lynch and author James Stoddard.

The podcast, Gone Ramblin, was started by two Turpin alumni that examines life in the Oklahoma Panhandle.

The Turpin Grain Elevator was situated on the BM&E’s line, and is now on the National Register of Historic Places listings in Beaver County, Oklahoma.

References

External links
Turpin Public Schools
Lynn Scott

Unincorporated communities in Beaver County, Oklahoma
Unincorporated communities in Oklahoma
Census-designated places in Beaver County, Oklahoma
Census-designated places in Oklahoma
Oklahoma Panhandle